Hexaammineplatinum(IV) chloride is the chemical compound with the formula [Pt(NH3)6]Cl4.  It is the chloride salt of the metal ammine complex [Pt(NH3)6]4+. The cation features six ammonia (called ammines in coordination chemistry) ligands attached to the platinum(IV) ion. It is a white, water soluble solid.

Properties and structure
Typical for platinum(IV) complexes, [Pt(NH3)6]4+ is diamagnetic and kinetically inert, e.g. unaffected by strong acids. The cation obeys the 18-electron rule. It is prepared by treatment of methylamine complex [Pt(NH2CH3)4Cl2]Cl2 with ammonia.

The complex [Pt(NH3)6]4+ is a rare example of a tetracationic ammine complex. Its conjugate bases [Pt(NH3)5NH2]3+ and [Pt(NH3)4(NH2)2]2+ have been characterized.

References

Platinum complexes
Inorganic compounds
Chlorides
Metal halides
Octahedral compounds
Ammine complexes